Letha Dawson Scanzoni (born 1935 in Pittsburgh, Pennsylvania) is an American independent scholar, writer, and freelance editor. She has authored or coauthored nine books, the most well-known of which are All We're Meant to Be and Is the Homosexual My Neighbor?  Scanzoni specializes in the intersection between religion and social issues.

From 1994 until her retirement in December, 2013, she served as editor of both the print and website editions of Christian Feminism Today (formerly EEWC Update), the publication of the Evangelical and Ecumenical Women's Caucus.

Biblical Feminism and All We're Meant to Be
Numerous scholars, whether they agree or disagree with the book's basic premise of gender equality, consider All We're Meant to Be to have been a major catalyst in launching the biblical feminist movement. It was preceded by two earlier articles Scanzoni wrote for Eternity magazine in 1966 and 1968.

Randall Balmer calls the book a "landmark manifesto,"  Leora Tanenbaum says Scanzoni and Hardesty were "the first to offer alternative biblical interpretations to mainstream evangelicals." Sociologist Sally Gallagher claims that All We're Meant to Be established its authors as "two of the most prominent voices in second-wave evangelical feminism." Pamela Cochran, In her book Evangelical Feminism: A History, refers to All We're Meant to Be as the "most influential work in helping launch the evangelical feminist movement" 
In As Christ Submits to the Church: A Biblical Understanding of Leadership and Mutual Submission, Alan G. Padgett speaks of a "new hermeneutic" for interpreting the Bible "regarding the place of women in church, home, and society" and asserts that "by all accounts, the first major book on this topic by neoevangelicals was Letha Scanzoni and Nancy Hardesty's All We're Meant to Be: A Biblical Approach to Women's Liberation."

One of the conservative critics of evangelical feminism, Wayne Grudem, states that the book reflects a "liberal tendency to reject the authority of Scripture" and that "while egalitarian positions had been advocated since the 1950s by theologically liberal Protestant writers, no evangelical books took such a position until 1974 . . .[when] freelance writers Letha Scanzoni and Nancy Hardesty published their groundbreaking book, All We're Meant to Be"  Arguing similarly, another critic, theology professor Jack Cottrell, has posted an online article titled "How Feminism Invaded the Church" in which he writes: "The major feminist writings during this period began with All We're Meant To Be: A Biblical Approach to Women's Liberation, by Letha Scanzoni and Nancy Hardesty (1974, then later editions). This was the early 'bible' of Evangelical feminism; it was called 'ground-breaking' and 'epoch-making.'" And, in Cottrell's opinion, it, along with other books following such an approach to Scripture, falsely interpreted what the Bible teaches.  According to the Encyclopedia of Women in Religion in North America All We're Meant to Be "became in many respects for evangelical women what the Church and the Second Sex (1972) by Mary Daly was for mainstream religious women" (p. 469).

Homosexuality and Christianity - Is The Homosexual My Neighbor and What God Has Joined Together
When Is the Homosexual My Neighbor? Another Christian View, coauthored with Virginia Ramey Mollenkott, was published in 1978, the publisher reported that "some 16 different titles on evangelical Christianity and homosexuality [were] currently being published, with the Scanzoni and Mollenkott volume being the only one which takes a positive stand.

Scanzoni’s most recent book is What God Has Joined Together: A Christian Case for Gay Marriage (HarperOne, 2005, 2006), coauthored with psychologist David G. Myers. In an added feature for the 2006 paperback edition, the authors interview each other and tell how they came to hold the views presented in their book—views that have been both praised and criticized.

Taking issue with Myers and Scanzoni's views, Al Mohler, President of Southern Baptist Theological Seminary, declares, "Their book offers positive proof that what drives proponents of same-sex marriage is a psychological worldview that is directly at odds with the worldview of the Bible."

Rosemary Radford Ruether sums up the book's arguments and concludes: "Scanzoni and Meyers [sic] argue that accepting gay marriage, far from threatening marriage, will confirm and strengthen the ideal of marriage itself for all of us, heterosexuals and homosexuals."

Personal life
Letha Dawson Scanzoni received a B.A. with high distinction, honors in religious studies, and membership in Phi Beta Kappa from Indiana University (Bloomington) in 1972. Earlier, she studied at the Eastman School of Music (University of Rochester, NY), 1952–1954, and at the Moody Bible Institute (Chicago), 1954–1956. 
She married John Scanzoni in 1956. They were divorced in 1983.

Awards and honors
All We're Meant to Be has received numerous honors. Designated as Eternity Magazine's "Book of the Year" in 1975, it was later listed among the 100 Christian Books That Changed the Century, named by Christianity Today for its 50th anniversary issue as one of the "Top Fifty Books that Have Shaped Evangelicals" (2006), and included in Besides the Bible: 100 Books That Have, Should, or Will Create Christian Culture (2010)

Bibliography
Youth Looks at Love (Fleming H. Revell, 1964) 
Why Am I Here? Where Am I Going?: Youth Looks at Life (Fleming H. Revell,  1966) 
Sex and the Single Eye (Zondervan, 1968).  Reissued as Why Wait? (Baker Book House, 1975) 
Sex Is a Parent Affair: Help for Parents in Teaching Their Children about Sex (Regal Books, 1973; revised updated second edition published by Bantam, 1982). 
All We're Meant to Be: A Biblical Approach to Women's Liberation, coauthored with Nancy A. Hardesty. (Word Books, 1974). Second edition (Abingdon, 1986), with a new subtitle, "Biblical Feminism for Today."  Revised, expanded, updated third edition (Eerdmans, 1992).  
Men, Women, and Change: A Sociology of Marriage and Family – a college textbook coauthored with John Scanzoni (McGraw-Hill, 1976; second edition. 1981; third edition, 1988).
Is the Homosexual My Neighbor? Another Christian View, coauthored with Virginia Ramey Mollenkott (Harper & Row, 1978. Revised, updated, expanded edition, Harper Collins (HarperOne imprint), 1994. In the 1994 edition, a new tag line, "a positive Christian response," was added after the title. This second edition also features an expanded preface telling the book's backstory. 
Sexuality, a volume assigned by Westminster Press and written as part of its "Choices-Guides for Today's Woman" series, each volume addressing a single topic and given a one-word title (1984).
What God Has Joined Together? A Christian Case for Gay Marriage  (with David Myers, HarperOne, 2005, 2006)

External links
 Letha Dawson Scanzoni's web site
 Contemporary Challenges for Religion and the Family from a Protestant Woman's Point of View Address presented at the "Conference on Religion and the Family," Brigham Young University, Provo, Utah, 1984, a social science conference sponsored by the BYU Family and Demographic Research Institute.

References

1935 births
American print editors
American feminists
Christian feminist theologians
Living people
Independent scholars
American religious writers
Women religious writers
20th-century American non-fiction writers
21st-century American non-fiction writers
Women print editors
21st-century American women writers
20th-century American women writers
American women non-fiction writers